Droylsden railway station served the town of Droylsden, Greater Manchester, England.

History 

The station was opened on 13 April 1846 by the Ashton, Stalybridge & Liverpool Junction Railway. The Manchester & Leeds Railway took over the running on 9 July 1847, on which date the latter changed its name to the Lancashire & Yorkshire Railway.

The station was closed by British Railways on 7 October 1968.

Location 

The Littlemoss Aqueduct carried the Hollinwood Branch of the Ashton Canal over the railway just west of the station. It was replaced with a footbridge after the canal was closed.

Routes

References 

The Manchester and Leeds Railway by Martin Bairstow
R.V.J. Butt, "The Directory of Railway Stations", Patrick Stephens, 1995, 

Disused railway stations in Tameside
Former Lancashire and Yorkshire Railway stations
Former London and North Western Railway stations
Railway stations in Great Britain opened in 1846
Railway stations in Great Britain closed in 1968
Beeching closures in England
1846 establishments in England
Droylsden